The Mayor of Abingdon-on-Thames is a ceremonial post held by a member of Abingdon-on-Thames Council, elected annually by the council. 

In 1556, Mary I of England granted a charter establishing a mayor, two bailiffs, twelve chief burgesses and sixteen secondary burgesses, the mayor to be clerk of the market, coroner and a Justice of the Peace. The charter nominated Richard Mayotte as the first Mayor in 1556. Originally, the mayor would be elected on the Feast of St. Michael and Archangel on 29 September.

Historical list of mayors

References

Abingdon-on-Thames
Mayors
Mayors